Partridge is a surname. Notable people with the name include:

Alden Partridge (1785–1854), United States Army officer, writer and politician
Alex Partridge (born 1981), British Olympic silver medal winning rower
Andy Partridge (born 1953), British guitarist and songwriter
Beatrice Partridge (1866 - 1963), English-born New Zealand painter
Dave Partridge, English footballer
David Partridge (born 1978), Welsh footballer
Don Partridge (1944–2010), English busker, one-man band and singer-songwriter
Edward Partridge Sr. (1793-1840), first bishop of the Church of Jesus Christ of Latter Day Saints
Eric Partridge (1894–1979), New Zealand–British lexicographer of the English language, particularly of its slang
Frances Partridge (née Marshall, 1900–2004), English writer
Frank Partridge (disambiguation), multiple people
George Partridge (1740–1828), American teacher and politician
George E. Partridge (1870–1953), American psychologist 
Haylee Partridge (born 1981), New Zealand cricketer
Ian Partridge (born 1938), English tenor
James Partridge (born 1953), English health economist, founder of Changing Faces charity
Jerry Partridge, American football coach
John Partridge (disambiguation), multiple people
Joseph Partridge (disambiguation), multiple people
Josiah Partridge (1805–1897), lawyer in South Australia
Joy Partridge (1899–1947), English international cricketer
Kenneth Partridge (1926–2015), English interior designer
Norman Partridge (cricketer) (1900–1982), English cricketer
Oliver Partridge (1712-1792), military commander, politician and early American patriot
Pat Partridge (1933–2014), English football referee
Ralph Partridge (1894–1960), member of Bloomsbury Group
Reuben Partridge (1823-1900), American pioneer bridge builder
Richard Partridge (1805–1873), British surgeon
Roi George Partridge (1888–1984), American printmaker
Travis Partridge (born 1990), American football player
Wendy Partridge, Canada-based costume designer
William Ordway Partridge (1861–1930), American sculptor

English-language surnames